Lolium multiflorum (Italian rye-grass, annual ryegrass) is a ryegrass native to temperate Europe, though its precise native range is unknown.

It is a herbaceous annual, biennial, or perennial grass that is grown for silage, and as a cover crop. It is also grown as an ornamental grass. It readily naturalizes in temperate climates, and can become a noxious weed in arable areas and an invasive species in native habitats.

It is a host plant to wheat yellow leaf virus in its native Europe.

It is sometimes considered a subspecies of perennial ryegrass (Lolium perenne). It differs from L. perenne in its spikelet, which has a long bristle at the top, and its stem, which is round rather than folded.

It can be mistaken for couch (Elymus repens), which has spikelets along the broad side of the stem rather than the edge.

Other common names in English include Australian ryegrass, short rotation ryegrass, and Westerwolds ryegrass. It is also one of several species called darnel.

Uses
Lolium multiflorum is widely used to provide large forage yields in short term leys where persistence of the crop is not a priority.
In the United States, Lolium multiflorum is sometimes used as a winter cover crop to prevent erosion, build soil structure and suppress weeds. As a palatable forage crop, it can be grazed by livestock and provide food in years when alfalfa suffers from winter kill.

References

External links

Pooideae
Flora of Europe
Flora of Italy
Flora of Lebanon
Garden plants of Europe
Lawn grasses
Plants described in 1779